Éva Gránitz (born 25 April 1966) is a Hungarian judoka. She competed at the 1992 Summer Olympics and the 1996 Summer Olympics.

References

External links
 

1966 births
Living people
Hungarian female judoka
Olympic judoka of Hungary
Judoka at the 1992 Summer Olympics
Judoka at the 1996 Summer Olympics
People from Siófok
Sportspeople from Somogy County
20th-century Hungarian women